2013–14 Hong Kong Senior Challenge Shield is the 112th season of one of the oldest football knockout competitions in Asia, Hong Kong Senior Challenge Shield. Unlike last two seasons, the competition will be played in single-legged tie.

The winner will guarantee a place in the 2013–14 Hong Kong Season Play-off.

Calendar

Bracket

Fixtures and results

First round

Quarter-finals

Semi-finals

Final

MATCH OFFICIALS
Assistant referees:
Lam Nai Kei
Lam Chi Ho
Fourth official: Ho Wai Sing
LP Local Player
FP Foreign Player

MATCH RULES
90 minutes. (1st Half Added Time: 2 mins, 2nd Half Added Time: min)
30 minutes of extra-time if necessary.
Penalty shoot-out if scores still level.
Seven named substitutes
Maximum of 3 substitutions.

Scorer
The scorers in the 2013–14 Hong Kong Senior Challenge Shield are as follows:

4 goals
  Giovane Alves da Silva (Eastern Salon)

3 goals

  Beto (Eastern Salon)
  Jonathan Carril (Royal Southern)
  Admir Raščić (Sun Pegasus)
  Jaimes McKee (Sun Pegasus)

2 goals

  Sham Kwok Keung (Citizen)
  João Emir Porto Pereira (South China)
  Lee Wai Lim (South China)
  Reinaldo Peres (Sunray Cave JC Sun Hei)
  Ju Yingzhi (Sun Pegasus)

1 goal

  Lam Hok Hei (Biu Chun Rangers)
  Lee Kil-Hoon (Biu Chun Rangers)
  Tales Schutz (Biu Chun Rangers)
  Sham Kwok Fai (Citizen)
  Wong Chin Hung (Eastern Salon)
  Fábio Lopes Alcântara (I-Sky Yuen Long)
  Jordi Tarrés (Kitchee)
  Andrew Barisic (South China)
  Dhiego de Souza Martins (South China)
  Sasa Kajkut (South China
  Ticão (South China)
  Chan Pak Hang (Sun Pegasus)
  Ling Cong (Tuen Mun)
  Kenji Fukuda (Yokohama FC Hong Kong)

Own goal
  Eugene Mbome (Sun Pegasus)

Prizes

External links
 Senior Shield - Hong Kong Football Association

2013-14
Shield
2013–14 domestic association football cups